Marko Vukcevic may refer to:

Marko Vukčević (handballer), Montenegrin handballer 
Marko Vukčević (footballer), Montenegrin footballer
Marko Vukčević (singer), Montenegrin singer
Marko Vukcevich, American guitarist
Marko Vukčić, Nero Wolfe's supporting character